Riells may refer to the following places in Catalonia, Spain:

 Riells i Viabrea, municipality in the comarca of Selva
 Riells (L'Escala), locality in the municipality of L'Escala (Alt Empordà)
 Bigues i Riells, municipality in the comarca of Vallès Oriental